README may refer to one of the following books or book collections:

Readme.cc, an online book portal since 2008
Reamde, a 2011 technothriller with an intentionally misspelled title
README.txt, a 2022 memoir